Gavangaon is a locality in South  Mumbai in the Trombay area connected with Arabian Sea. The population mostly consists of Agri People (Mhatres & Patils) in Gavangoan who were the first inhabitants of Mumbai.

Religion
There are total three old Temples in Gavangaon built and developed by the local people. Maru Aai Temple which is also known as The Gaav Devi Mandir, then The Baap Dev Mandir, and The Vitthal Rakhmai Mandir.

Businesses
There are industrial establishments operated by Tata Power, BARC, HPCL, BPCL, LUBE INDIA LTD, AEGIS, IOCL, ONGC, MSEB, Standard Drum & Barrel Co. PVT LTD and Bombay Paints. All This Companies were established & developed with the help of Gavangaon Agri (Community)peoples & others who later on came in search of job in Gavangaon.

Transport
Best bus services are available from Gavangaon, connecting to Ghatkopar railway station, Navi Mumbai, Electric House, Mumbai Central, Santacruz, Chembur railway station, Kurla railway station and Bandra railway station. The newly made Eastern Freeway has made easier for the people of Gavangaon to travel to South Mumbai and Vashi and Panvel.

References

External links
Google map

Neighbourhoods in Mumbai